Aspidura is a genus of the Colubridae family of snakes that is endemic to island of Sri Lanka which is commonly known as rough-sided snake, and as මැඩිල්ලා (maedilla) in Sinhala. Black-spined snake which was once in the genus Haplocercus is now added to this genus. The genus is now comprised with 9 species, with the latest discovery in 2019.

Species

 Boie's rough-sided snake Aspidura brachyorrhos Sri Lanka
 Black-spined snake Aspidura ceylonensis Sri Lanka
 Cope's rough-sided snake Aspidura copei Sri Lanka
 Deraniyagala's rough-sided snake Aspidura deraniyagalae Sri Lanka
De Silva's rough-sided snake Aspidura desilvai Sri Lanka
 Drummond-Hay's rough-sided snake Aspidura drummondhayi Sri Lanka
 Gunther's rough-sided snake Aspidura guentheri Sri Lanka
 Ravana's rough-sided snake Aspidura ravanai Sri Lanka
 Common rough-sided snake Aspidura trachyprocta Sri Lanka

References

 http://biostor.org/reference/40976
 http://jpaleontol.geoscienceworld.org/content/72/2/401.citation
 https://www.amazon.com/Aspidura-Serpentes-reptilia-Colubridae-Carnegie/dp/B00072JZSO

Aspidura
Reptiles of Sri Lanka
Snake genera
Taxa named by Johann Georg Wagler